Prince Pyotr Dmitrievich Gorchakov (24 June 17906 March 1868) was an Imperial Russian Army general from the Gorchakov family of Russian nobility.

Life 
He was an elder brother of Mikhail D. Gorchakov (1793–1861) imperial general of the artillery. He served under Mikhail Kamensky and Mikhail Kutuzov in the campaign against Turkey, and afterwards against France in 1813–1814. In 1820 he suppressed an insurrection in the Caucasus, for which service he was raised to the rank of major-general. In 1828–1829 he fought under Prince Peter von Wittgenstein against the Turks, won an action at Aidos, and signed the treaty of peace at Adrianople. In 1839 he was made governor of Eastern Siberia, and in 1851 retired into private life.

When the Crimean War broke out he offered his services to the emperor Nicholas, by whom he was appointed general of the VI army corps in the Crimea. He commanded the corps in the battles of Alma and Inkerman. He retired in 1855 and died at Moscow, on March 18, 1868.

References 

1790 births
1868 deaths
Pyotr
Imperial Russian Army generals
Members of the State Council (Russian Empire)
Russian military personnel of the Caucasian War
Russian military personnel of the Crimean War
Russian military personnel of the Napoleonic Wars